Leslie Palmer (born 17 June 1910, died 1997) was a British water polo player who competed in the 1936 Summer Olympics.

He was part of the British team which finished eighth in the 1936 tournament. He played one match, against Austria.

References

External links
 

1910 births
1997 deaths
British male water polo players
Olympic water polo players of Great Britain
Water polo players at the 1936 Summer Olympics